Gladness is a synonym for happiness.

Gladness may also refer to:

 Gladness Stakes, a horse race in Ireland
 Mickell Gladness (born 1986), American professional basketball player

See also
 Glad (disambiguation)
 Gladding